John Bingham (15 July 1864 – 23 July 1946) was an Australian cricketer. He played six first-class matches for Tasmania between 1892 and 1901.

See also
 List of Tasmanian representative cricketers

References

External links
 

1864 births
1946 deaths
Australian cricketers
Tasmania cricketers
Cricketers from Tasmania